Daniel Jocelyn (born 11 September 1970) is a New Zealand equestrian. He competed in eventing at the 2004 Summer Olympics in Athens.

References

1970 births
Living people
New Zealand male equestrians
Olympic equestrians of New Zealand
Equestrians at the 2004 Summer Olympics